North Harrison High School is a public high school located in Ramsey, Indiana.

See also
 List of high schools in Indiana

References

External links
North Harrison High School Website
School Statistics

Public high schools in Indiana
Schools in Harrison County, Indiana
1969 establishments in Indiana